Westbrook Mall is a shopping centre in Calgary, Alberta. Its anchors are Safeway and Walmart. The Westbrook Station on the West Line of the C-Train is located adjacent to the mall.

Location

Westbrook Mall is located in the west part of Calgary, not far away from Shaganappi Golf Course, on the corner of Bow Trail SW and 37 St SW. The shopping mall is easily accessible by car, by bus or by the CTrain.  A bus stop is located next to the mall, serving bus numbers 6, 9, 70, 93, 111 and MAX Teal. Westbrook LRT Station is a short walk away from the mall.

Tenants
 Jubilations Dinner Theatre
 Safeway
 Walmart

References

External links
Westbrook Mall

Shopping malls in Calgary